The oldest settled group are the Kovači (Blacksmiths), a subgroup of the Arlije, who have lived there since the Middle Ages and who converted to Islam during the Ottoman period, they do not speak Balkan Romani, but rather Montenegrin language or Albanian language, they live especially in the towns of Bar, Montenegro and Ulcinj. They do not want to be called Roma and distance themselves from other Roma groups. They have no roma traditions. They call themselves only as Muslims (ethnic group).

There are also the Gurbeti who belong to the Čergarja group, they were once nomadic. In the 1960s they became sedentary. Most of them have the Christian faith of the Eastern Orthodox Church.

Then there are Muslim Roma, Ashkali and Balkan Egyptians refugees, who came to Montenegro during the Kosovo War in 1999.

References

Ethnic groups in Montenegro
Montenegro
Montenegro
Romani communities in Montenegro